Kahraba Zouk is a Lebanese sports club most known for its basketball program. It is located at Zouk, Kesrouan, Lebanon.

Kahraba Zouk basketball team is part of the Lebanese Basketball League 1st division and at times second division for many years. Sarkis korjian is the coach for kahraba club. Kahraba won the tournament of Antoine ghorayeb of year 2016 of categories 99-00

Notable players
Rony Fahed.

Basketball teams in Lebanon
Keserwan District